Carole S. LaFavor (1942–2011) was an Ojibwe novelist, Native American rights activist and nurse. Known for her HIV/AIDS activism, she was featured in Mona Smith's 1988 film Her Giveway about her experiences living with the disease. Her two novels, Along the Journey River and Evil Dead Center were both published by Firebrand Books and her essay "Walking the Red Road" appears in the anthology Positive Women: Voices of Women Living with AIDS edited by Andrea Rudd and Darien Taylor.

Personal life
LaFavor was born in Minnesota on February 12, 1942 and identified as two-spirit and lesbian.

In 1983, laFavor spoke of her rape by two white men during the proceedings of the Minneapolis Antipornography Civil Rights Ordinance.

HIV/AIDS work
LaFavor worked with the Minnesota American Indian AIDS Task Force and was a member of the President's Advisory Council on HIV/AIDS from 1995–1997, where she served as the only Native American member. Diagnosed with HIV in 1986, she was a founding member of Positively Native, an organisation that supports Native American people with HIV/AIDS. LaFavor promoted the use of traditional medicine for Native Americans with HIV/AIDS and urged Native Americans to reintegrate into tribal nations and communities to help Native women receive culturally appropriate HIV/AIDS support.

Death
LaFavor died on November 21, 2011.

Bibliography
 Along the Journey River (1996)
 Evil Dead Center (1998)

References

External links
 Presidential Advisory Council on HIV/AIDS (PACHA)

American nurses
American women nurses
Writers from Minnesota
Native American activists
Native American writers
Ojibwe people
Two-spirit people
20th-century Native Americans
2011 deaths
Non-binary activists
LGBT people from Minnesota
1948 births
20th-century Native American women
21st-century American LGBT people
American non-binary writers